The Don Hutson Center  is the indoor practice facility of the Green Bay Packers.  Located across the street from Lambeau Field, it was built in 1994 at a cost of $4.7 million.

The center is named after Don Hutson, who played for the Packers from 1935 to 1945.  A member of both the Pro Football and Packers Halls of Fame, Hutson was the dominant player of his era, setting records that stood for 50 years after his retirement.

The Don Hutson Center is the largest element of the Packers' practice complex, which includes Ray Nitschke Field and Clarke Hinkle Field, which were also named after Packer greats.

There are two practice fields inside the Center: a  field runs east–west, with another  field running north–south, allowing the offense and defense to practice simultaneously. The FieldTurf surfaces allow the Packers to replicate game conditions for road games where they will have to play indoors or on artificial surfaces.

The Packers' video department has elevated camera positions on the inside of the Hutson Center for filming practices, as well as four porches on the exterior of the west side for filming practices at Clarke Hinkle Field.

The Center was dedicated on July 18, 1994, at a ceremony presided over by the then 81-year-old Hutson himself.

References

American football venues in Wisconsin
Green Bay Packers stadiums
Sports venues in Green Bay, Wisconsin
Sports venues completed in 1994
1994 establishments in Wisconsin